Chogha Sorkh (also Romanized as Choghā Sorkh and Cheghā Sorkh; also known as Cheghā Sabz, Chogha Sabz, and Chūgha Sabz) is a village in Shamsabad Rural District, in the Central District of Dezful County, Khuzestan Province, Iran. At the 2006 census, its population was 825, in 177 families.

References 

Populated places in Dezful County